The Newfoundland is a large breed of working dog. They can be black, grey, brown, or black and white. However, in the Dominion of Newfoundland, before it became part of the confederation of Canada, only black and Landseer (white-and-black) coloured dogs were considered to be proper members of the breed. They were originally bred and used as working dogs for fishermen in Newfoundland. Newfoundlands are known for their giant size, intelligence, tremendous strength, calm disposition, love of children and loyalty. They excel at water rescue/lifesaving because of their muscular build, thick double coat, webbed paws, and swimming abilities.

Description

Appearance

Newfoundlands ('Newfs' or 'Newfies') have webbed paws and a water-resistant coat.

The American Kennel Club (AKC) standard colours of the Newfoundland are black, brown, grey, and white-and-black (sometimes referred to as a Landseer). Other colours are possible but are not considered rare or more valuable. The Kennel Club (KC) permits only black, brown, and white/black; the Canadian Kennel Club (CKC) permits only black and white/black. The "Landseer" pattern is named after the artist, Sir Edwin Henry Landseer, who featured them in many of his paintings. Fédération Cynologique Internationale (FCI) consider the ECT Landseer ("European Continental Type") to be a separate breed. It is a taller, more narrow white dog with black markings not bred with a Newfoundland.

The Newfoundland's extremely large bones give it mass, while its large musculature gives it the power it needs to take on rough ocean waves and powerful tides. These dogs have huge lung capacity for swimming extremely long distances and a thick, oily, and waterproof double coat which protects them from the chill of icy waters. The double coat makes the dog hard to groom, and also causes a lot of shedding to occur. The droopy lips and jowls make the dog drool, especially in high heat.

In the water, the Newfoundland's massive webbed paws give it maximum propulsion. The swimming stroke is not an ordinary dog paddle: Unlike other dogs, the Newfoundland moves its limbs in a down-and-out motion giving more power to every stroke.

Temperament

The Newfoundland is known for its calm and docile nature and its strength. They are very loyal, have a mild nature, and make great working dogs. It is for this reason that this breed is known as "the gentle giant". International kennel clubs generally describe the breed as having a sweet temper. The breed typically has a deep bark and is easy to train if started young. They are wonderfully good with children, but small children can get accidentally leaned on and knocked down. Newfoundlands are ideal companions in the world of therapy and are often referred to as "nanny dogs". The breed was memorialised in "Nana", the beloved guardian dog in J. M. Barrie's Peter Pan. The Newfoundland, in general, is good with other animals, but its size can cause problems if it is not properly trained.

A Newfoundland's good, sweet nature is so important, it is listed in the breed standards of many countries; dogs exhibiting poor temperament or aggression are disqualified from showing and should never be used to breed. The breed standard in the United States reads that "Sweetness of temperament is the hallmark of the Newfoundland; this is the most important single characteristic of the breed."

Health
There are several health problems associated with Newfoundlands. Newfoundlands are prone to hip dysplasia (a malformed ball and socket in the hip joint). They also get elbow dysplasia, and cystinuria (a hereditary defect that forms calculi stones in the bladder).  Another genetic problem is subvalvular aortic stenosis (SAS). This is a common heart defect in Newfoundlands involving defective heart valves. SAS can cause sudden death at an early age. It is similar to having a heart attack.  The breed may live to be 8 to 10 years of age; 10 years is a commonly cited life expectancy. However, Newfoundlands can live up to 15 years old.

History

Origin
Genome analysis indicates that Newfoundlands are related to the Irish water spaniel, Labrador Retriever, and Curly-Coated Retriever. 

The Newfoundland was originally bred and used as working dogs for fishermen in Newfoundland.

In the early 1880s, fishermen and explorers from Ireland and England travelled to the Grand Banks of Newfoundland, where they described two main types of working dogs. One was heavily built, large with a longish coat, and the other medium-sized in build – an active, smooth-coated water dog. The heavier breed was known as the Greater Newfoundland, or Newfoundland. The smaller breed was known as the Lesser Newfoundland, or St. John's water dog. The St. John's water dog became the founding breed of modern retrievers. Both breeds were used as working dogs to pull fishnets, with the Greater Newfoundland also being used to haul carts and other equipment.

It has also been proposed that the original Newfoundland that lived on the island was smaller; in theory, the smaller landrace was bred with mastiffs when sold to the English, and the English version was popularized to become what we think of as a Newfoundland today.

Reputation
The breed's working role was varied. Many tales have been told of the courage displayed by Newfoundlands in adventuring and lifesaving exploits. Over the last two centuries, this has inspired a number of artists, who have portrayed the dogs in paint, stone, bronze, and porcelain. One famous Newfoundland was named Seaman, one of the most traveled dogs in human history, who accompanied American explorers Lewis and Clark on their expedition from the Mississippi to the Pacific and back, a journey that took 3 years. A statue of him is included in many Lewis and Clark monuments. Many children's books have been written about him (see Seaman (dog)#Children's books about Seaman).

The breed prospered in the United Kingdom, until 1914 and again in 1939, when its numbers were almost fatally depleted by wartime restrictions. Since the 1950s there has been a steady increase in numbers and popularity, despite the fact that the Newfoundland's great size and fondness for mud and water makes it unsuitable as a pet for many households.

Water rescue
During the Discovery Channel's second day of coverage of the American Kennel Club Eukanuba National Championship on December 3, 2006, anchor Bob Goen reported that Newfoundlands exhibit a very strong propensity to rescue people from water. Goen stated that one Newfoundland alone aided the rescue of 63 shipwrecked sailors. Today, kennel clubs across the United States host Newfoundland Rescue Demonstrations, as well as offering classes in the field. Many harbour boat tours in St John's have a dog on board for local charm as well as for passenger safety.
 An unnamed Newfoundland is credited for saving Napoleon Bonaparte in 1815. During his famous escape from exile on the island of Elba, rough seas knocked Napoleon overboard. A fisherman's dog jumped into the sea, and kept Napoleon afloat until he could reach safety.
 In 1828, Ann Harvey of Isle aux Morts, her father, her brother, and a Newfoundland named Hairyman saved over 160 Irish immigrants from the wreck of the brig Despatch.
 In 1881 in Melbourne, Australia, a Newfoundland named Nelson helped rescue Thomas Brown, a cab driver who was swept away by flood waters in Swanston Street on the night of November 15. While little is known about what became of Nelson, a copper dog collar engraved with his name has survived and 130 years after the rescue it was acquired by the National Museum of Australia and is now part of the National Historical Collection.
 In the early 20th century, a dog that is thought to have been a Newfoundland saved 92 people who were on the SS Ethie which was wrecked off of the Northern Peninsula of Newfoundland during a blizzard. The dog retrieved a rope thrown out into the turbulent waters by those on deck, and brought the rope to shore to people waiting on the beach. A breeches buoy was attached to the rope, and all those aboard the ship were able to get across to the shore including an infant in a mailbag. Wreckage of the ship can still be seen in Gros Morne National Park. E. J. Pratt's poem "Carlo", in the November 1920 issue of the Canadian Forum, commemorates this dog.
 In 1995, a 10-month-old Newfoundland named Boo saved a hearing-impaired man from drowning in the Yuba River in Northern California. The man fell into the river while dredging for gold. Boo noticed the struggling man as he and his owner were walking along the river. The Newfoundland instinctively dove into the river, took the drowning man by the arm, and brought him to safety. According to Janice Anderson, the Newfoundland’s breeder, Boo had received no formal training in water rescue.

Further evidence of Newfoundlands' ability to rescue or support life-saving activities was cited in a 2007 article by the BBC.

Relationship to other breeds
The Newfoundland shares many physical traits with mastiffs and Molosser-type dogs, such as the St. Bernard and English Mastiff, including stout legs, massive heads with very broad snouts, a thick bull-like neck, and a very sturdy bone structure. Many St. Bernards have Newfoundlands in their ancestry. Newfoundlands were brought and introduced to the St. Bernard breed in the 18th century when the population was threatened by an epidemic of canine distemper. They share many characteristics of many livestock guardian dog breeds, such as the Great Pyrenees.

Because of their strength, Newfoundlands were part of the foundation stock of the Leonberger (which excelled at water rescue and was imported by the Canadian government for that purpose); and the now-extinct Moscow Water Dog, a failed attempt at creating a lifesaving dog by the Russian state kennel—the unfortunate outcross with the Caucasian Shepherd Dog begat a dog more adept at biting than rescuing.

Famous Newfoundlands

Napoleon the Wonder Dog
A famous all-black Newfoundland performed as the star attraction in Van Hare's Magic Circus from 1862 and for many years thereafter in one of England's founding circus acts, traveling throughout Europe. The circus dog was known as the "Thousand Guinea Dog Napoleon" or "Napoleon the Wonder Dog." The circus owner, G. Van Hare, trained other Newfoundland dogs to perform a steeplechase routine with baboons dressed up as jockeys to ride them. Nonetheless, his "wizard dog" Napoleon was his favourite and held a special position in the Magic Circus. Napoleon would compete at jumping against human rivals, leaping over horses from a springboard, and dancing to music.

Napoleon the Wonder Dog became a wildly popular act in London from his debut at the Pavilion Theatre on April 4, 1862, and onward until his untimely death many years later when he slipped and fell during a circus practice session. At the peak of his fame, his performance was described in London's Illustrated Sporting News and Theatrical and Musical Review as follows: "Synopsis of his entertainment:— He spells his own name with letters, also that of the Prince of Wales; and when he is asked what he would say of her Most Gracious Majesty, he puts down letters to form 'God save the Queen.' He plays any gentleman a game of cards and performs the celebrated three-card trick upon which his master backs him at 100 to 1. Also 'The Disappearance,' a la Robin. He performs in a circus the same as a trick horse, en liberté, giving the Spanish trot to music, also leaping over bars, through balloons, with numerous other tricks of a most interesting character."

When Napoleon the Wonder Dog died at the age of 12 years old, his passing was announced in a number of British newspapers, including the Sheffield Daily Telegraph, which mentioned the loss on May 5, 1868, as follows:  "DEATH OF A CELEBRATED FOUR-FOOTED ARTISTE. — Mr. Van Hare's renowned dog, Napoleon, designated 'The Wizard Dog,' died on 24th ult., aged twelve years.  He was a noble specimen of the Newfoundland breed (weighing near 200 lbs.) for which he took the prize at the first Agricultural Hall Dog Show.  Besides his magnificent appearance and symmetry, he was the most extraordinary sagacious and highly-trained animal ever known.  He is now being preserved and beautifully mounted by the celebrated naturalist, Mr. Edwin Ward. — Era."

Other famous Newfoundlands

 Bashaw (Matthew Cotes Wyatt): the Earl of Dudley's favourite dog, and the inspiration for a sculpture by Matthew Cotes Wyatt at the Victoria and Albert Museum in London
 Bilbo: a lifeguard Newfoundland on Sennen beach in Cornwall—credited with saving three lives
 Boatswain: pet of English poet Lord Byron and the subject of his poem "Epitaph to a Dog". Byron attempted to nurse Boatswain back to health when the dog contracted rabies, but was unsuccessful. When Boatswain died, Byron constructed a monument for him at Newstead Abbey.
 Bouncer: presented by the children of Newfoundland, with a dog-cart, as a gift to the Duke and Duchess of Cornwall and York (later George V and Queen Mary), during their visit to the colony in 1901
 Frank: unofficial mascot of the Orphan Brigade during the American Civil War
 Gander: the World War II mascot of the Royal Rifles of Canada, also known as "Sergeant Gander", which was killed in action at the Battle of Hong Kong when he carried a grenade away from wounded soldiers. For this, he was awarded the PDSA Dickin Medal retroactively in 2000. A memorial statue can be viewed at the Gander Heritage Memorial Park (Gander, NL).
 Gipsy: Lemuel and Emma Wilmarth's dog which saved the latter from drowning, lived to be 23 years old, and inspired a poem by ASPCA founder Henry Bergh.
 Luath: J. M. Barrie's Landseer Newfoundland and the inspiration for "Nana," the Darling children's nurse in Peter Pan.
 Rigel: suspected pet of first officer William Murdoch aboard the RMS Titanic. Murdoch went down with the ship, but Rigel swam for three hours next to a lifeboat until it was rescued by the RMS Carpathia. Rigel is renowned as a hero alerting the Carpathias captain of the weakened survivors before the ship hit them. Rigel was adopted by crewman Jonas Briggs.
 Sable Chief: World War I mascot of the Royal Newfoundland Regiment
 Seaman: his name once misread as Scannon, this dog travelled with the Lewis and Clark Expedition from the Mississippi to the Pacific Ocean and back, a three-year trip (1804 to 1806). His collar tag, now lost but once in a museum, read:

 Swansea Jack: famous Welsh rescue dog identified as a Newfoundland, but which had an appearance more like a modern-day Flat-Coated Retriever

Gallery

See also
 
 
 List of dog breeds

References

Explanatory notes

Citations

Further reading

External links

 

FCI breeds
Dog breeds originating in Canada
Lifesaving
Provincial symbols of Newfoundland and Labrador